This is a list of colleges in Haiti.

Colleges

This is a list of colleges in Haiti.

References

External links 

Haiti
 
Schools